Nils Sture Carl Gustaf Sjöstedt (8 May 1916 – 5 July 2008) was an actor, producer, distributor and cinematographer.  He has acted in films directed by Charles Kaufman and produced films directed by Joseph W. Sarno.

Career
Sjöstedt was during his movie career, such a film director at the Stockholm film and film director at Minerva Film, where he among other things, for a time produced and did the research for the important documentaries of the bloody time insanity of war and war criminals.  But above all he ran his own production and distribution company, Saga Film.  It was acting as a film producer, he became the man who gave the sausage an entirely new use.  He himself used to joke and say that on his tombstone would read "here lies the man who made sausage film".

Some of his other Production, distribution and cinematography credits include: Vild på Sex (Confessions of a Sex Kitten), Nøglehullet (The Keyhole), Butterflies and Fäbodjäntan (Girl Mountain) - which is probably Sweden's  best known and seen porn film of all time.

His only acting credits are Mother's Day and When Nature Calls. both films from Troma.

Filmography

References

External links

1916 births
2008 deaths
Swedish male film actors